Bishan most commonly refers to Bishan, Singapore, a residential town in Singapore's Central Region, and its associated places.

Bishan may also refer to:

Places

Singapore
 Bishan, Singapore
 Bishan MRT station, a MRT interchange station along the North South line and the Circle line
 Bishan tunnel flooding, a major incident in 2017 that occurred near the station
 Bishan Depot, a MRT train depot located near the station
 Bishan Bus Interchange, a bus station in Bishan
 Bishan Public Library, a public library in Bishan
 Bishan Sports Hall, a sports complex in Bishan
 Bishan Stadium, a multi-purpose stadium in Bishan
 Bishan-Ang Mo Kio Park, a neighbourhood park in Bishan
 Bishan East, a subzone within Bishan
 Bishan otter family, a family of smooth-coated otters residing in Bishan
 Bishan–Toa Payoh Group Representation Constituency, an electoral constituency in Singapore
 Bishan Park, a park in Singapore

China
 Bishan District, a district located west of Chongqing, China
 Bishan railway station, a railway station within Bishan on the Chengyu Passenger Railway
 Bishan station (Chongqing Rail Transit), a metro station located in Bishan
 Bishan Temple, a temple located in Shanxi, China

Other countries
 Bisahan, Jhajjar (or Bishan), a village in the Jhajjar district of Haryana, India
 Bishan Khedi, a village in the Bhopal district of Madhya Pradesh, India
 Bishan Daur, a village in the Punjab province of Pakistan

People
 Bishan Singh (1672–1699), ruler of Amber and head of the Kachwaha Rajput clan from 1688 to 1699
 Bishan Singh (environmentalist) (1944–2006), Malaysian social activist and environmentalist
 Bishan Singh Bedi (born 1946), Indian cricketer
 Bishan Singh Chuphal, Indian politician
 Bishan Narayan Dar (1864–1916), Indian politician
 Bishanchander Seth, Indian politician

See also
 Gishan, Hormozgan, also known as "Bīshān Takht", a village in Hormozgan Province, Iran
 Bishan station (disambiguation)